Pietro da Pavia, Can.Reg. (died 1 August 1182) was bishop-elect of Meaux (1171–1175), Cardinal-Priest of S. Crisogono (1173–1179) and finally Cardinal-Bishop of Tusculum (in May 1179). He was papal legate, together with Henri de Marsiac, in southern France against Cathars and Waldenses 1174–1178. He participated in the Third Lateran Council in 1179. Then he was sent again as papal legate to southern France and to Germany. He subscribed the papal bulls issued between October 14, 1173 and July 14, 1182. In 1180 he was elected archbishop of Bourges but it seems that he did not assume that post.

Notes

External links
Suburbicarian see of Frascati
Philipp Jaffé (1819–1870), Regesta pontificum Romanorum ab condita Ecclesia ad annum post Christum natum MCXCVIII, Berlin 1851, p. 677 and 834

References

Peter, Julian Haseldine, The Letters of Peter of Celle, Oxford University Press, 2001, p. 378-379
I. S. Robinson, The Papacy 1073-1198. Continuity and innovation., Cambridge University Press, 1990
Johannes M. Brixius, Die Mitglieder des Kardinalkollegiums von 1130-1181, Berlin 1912, p. 65 no. 23

12th-century Italian cardinals
Cardinal-bishops of Frascati
Archbishops of Bourges
1182 deaths
Year of birth unknown
People from Pavia